Kurt Stern (1907 in Berlin – 1989) was a screenwriter who worked for the DEFA film studio in East Germany. He worked in partnership with his wife Jeanne (née Machin). In 1953, together with director Martin Hellberg, the Sterns were awarded the Gold Medal of the World Peace Council for the film Das verurteilte Dorf ("The condemned village").

References

External links

1907 births
1989 deaths
Writers from Berlin
Communist Party of Germany politicians
Socialist Unity Party of Germany politicians
German male screenwriters
East German writers
International Brigades personnel
Recipients of the National Prize of East Germany
German male writers
Film people from Berlin
20th-century German screenwriters